Ehretioideae is a subfamily of the flowering plant family Boraginaceae.

Genera
 Bourreria P.Browne
 Cortesia Cav.
 Ehretia P.Browne
 Halgania Gaudich.
 Ixorhea Fenzl
 Lepidocordia Ducke
 Menais Loefl.
 Patagonula L.
 Rochefortia Sw.
 Rotula Lour.
 Tiquilia Pers.

References

 
Asterid subfamilies